In Greek mythology, the goddess Pandia  or Pandeia (meaning "all brightness") was a daughter of Zeus and the goddess Selene, the Greek personification of the moon. From the Homeric Hymn to Selene, we have: "Once the Son of Cronos [Zeus] was joined with her [Selene] in love; and she conceived and bare a daughter Pandia, exceeding lovely amongst the deathless gods." An Athenian tradition perhaps made Pandia the wife of Antiochus, the eponymous hero of Antiochis, one of the ten Athenian tribes (phylai).

Originally Pandia may have been an epithet of Selene, but by at least the time of the late Homeric Hymn, Pandia had become a daughter of Zeus and Selene. Pandia (or Pandia Selene) may have personified the full moon, and an Athenian festival called the Pandia (probably held for Zeus) was perhaps celebrated on the full-moon and may have been connected to her.

Notes

References
 Allen, Thomas W., E. E. Sikes. The Homeric Hymns, edited, with preface, apparatus criticus, notes, and appendices.  London. Macmillan. 1904.
 Bekker, Immanuel, Anecdota Graeca: Lexica Segueriana, Apud G.C. Nauckium, 1814.
 Cashford, Jules, The Homeric Hymns, Penguin Books, 2003. .
 Cook, Arthur Bernard, Zeus: Zeus, God of the Bright Sky, Volume 1 of Zeus: A Study in Ancient Religion, Biblo and Tannen, 1914.
 Cox, George W. The Mythology of the Aryan Nations Part, Vol. II, London, C. Kegan Paul & Co., 1 Paternoster Square, 1878. Internet Archive.
 Fairbanks, Arthur, The Mythology of Greece and Rome.  D. Appleton–Century Company, New York, 1907.
 Hall, Alexander E. W., "Dating the Homeric Hymn to Selene: Evidence and Implications", Greek, Roman, and Byzantine Studies 53 (2013): 15–30. PDF.
 Hard, Robin, The Routledge Handbook of Greek Mythology: Based on H.J. Rose's "Handbook of Greek Mythology", Psychology Press, 2004, . Google Books.
 Hyginus, Gaius Julius, The Myths of Hyginus. Edited and translated by Mary A. Grant, Lawrence: University of Kansas Press, 1960.
 Homeric Hymn to Selene (32), in The Homeric Hymns and Homerica with an English Translation by Hugh G. Evelyn-White, Cambridge, Massachusetts., Harvard University Press; London, William Heinemann Ltd. 1914. Online version at the Perseus Digital Library.
 
 Müller, Karl Otfried, History of the literature of ancient Greece, Volume 1, Baldwin and Cradock, 1840.
 Obbink, Dirk,  "56. Orphism, Cosmogony, and Gealogy (Mus. fr. 14)" in Tracing Orpheus: Studies of Orphic Fragments, edited by Miguel Herrero de Jáuregui, Walter de Gruyter, 2011. .
 Parker, Robert, Polytheism and Society at Athens, Oxford University Press, 2005. .
 Robertson, Noel, "Athena's Shrines and Festivals" in Worshipping Athena: Panathenaia and Parthenon, The University of Wisconsin Press, 1996.  .
 Roscher, Wilhelm Heinrich, Über Selene und Verwandtes, B. G. Teubner, Leizig 1890.
 Smith, William; A Dictionary of Greek and Roman Antiquities. William Smith, LLD. William Wayte. G. E. Marindin. Albemarle Street, London. John Murray. 1890. Online version at the Perseus Digital Library.
 Tsagalis, Christos, "CHAPTER THREE. Performance Contexts for Rhapsodic Recitals in the Hellenistic Period" in Homer in Performance: Rhapsodes, Narrators, and Characters, Editors: Jonathan Ready, Christos Tsagalis, University of Texas Press, 2018. .
 
 Willetts, R. F., Cretan Cults and Festivals, Greenwood Press, 1980. .

External links

 Theoi Project - Pandia

Greek goddesses
Lunar goddesses
Children of Zeus
Personifications in Greek mythology
Children of Selene